Cryptanthus praetextus is a species in the genus Cryptanthus. This species is endemic to Brazil.

References

praetextus
Flora of Brazil